Scott Kelman (born May 7, 1981) is a Canadian former professional ice hockey center who was drafted in the first round, 15th overall, by the Phoenix Coyotes in the 1999 NHL Entry Draft but never played an NHL game.

Over his professional career of 7 seasons, Kelman predominantly played in the American Hockey League and the ECHL. He concluded his professional career after the 2008-09 season abroad with the Coventry Blaze in the Elite Ice Hockey League.

Career statistics

References

External links

1981 births
Living people
Albany River Rats players
Augusta Lynx players
Canadian ice hockey centres
Coventry Blaze players
Dayton Bombers players
Fresno Falcons players
Gwinnett Gladiators players
Hershey Bears players
Jackson Bandits players
Laredo Bucks players
Lowell Lock Monsters players
Manitoba Moose players
Moose Jaw Warriors players
National Hockey League first-round draft picks
Ice hockey people from Winnipeg
Arizona Coyotes draft picks
Phoenix RoadRunners players
San Antonio Rampage players
Seattle Thunderbirds players
Tri-City Americans players
Canadian expatriate ice hockey players in England